George Lane (25 July 1852 – 31 July 1917) was an English first-class cricketer active 1880–1900 who played for Nottinghamshire and various teams in the USA where he was a resident. He was born in Kimberley, Nottinghamshire; died in Haverford, Pennsylvania.

References

1852 births
1917 deaths
English cricketers
Nottinghamshire cricketers
People from Kimberley, Nottinghamshire
Cricketers from Nottinghamshire
People from Haverford Township, Pennsylvania
American cricketers
English emigrants to the United States